The following is a list of the IRMA's number-one singles of 2001.

See also
 2001 in music
 List of artists who reached number one in Ireland

2001 in Irish music
2001 record charts
2001